The Long Night of the Sciences has become an established form of public relations activity in Germany. On one night of the year, large scientific institutions hold lectures and demonstrations for the general public in order to present themselves and a general overview of their research topics. The events cover all aspects of science, from natural sciences to social sciences. The public can usually visit the institutions between around 5pm and 1am on the "Long Night of the Sciences" in exchange for a fee.

Origin 

The format of the event is inspired by the successful Long Night of Museums in Berlin. The event first took place as part of the Science Summer 2000 event in Bonn. Berlin organized a similar event the following year and gained a larger response, with a total of  visitors.

Distribution 

Besides Berlin, this event format has also been successfully implemented in other scientific locations, including:

 Hamburg (since 2005)
 Halle (since 2001)
 Dresden (since 2002)
 Rostock
 Aachen (since 2003)
 Nuremberg/Fürth/Erlangen (since 2003)
 Tübingen, Jena (since 2005)
 Stuttgart (2006)
 Erfurt, Duisburg-Essen (since 2007)
 Freiberg (since 2007)
 Heidelberg, Mannheim, Ludwigshafen (since 2007)
 Garching (since 2007)
 Leipzig (since 2008)
 Magdeburg
 Frankfurt
 Hannover (since 2011)
 Ilmenau (since 2007)

Berlin and Potsdam 

The program for the 9th "Long Night of the Sciences" in Berlin and Potsdam on 13 June 2009  featured more than  individual events held by 67 participants in 160 buildings. 15 special bus routes were provided for the night. There were around  visitors in total.

Nuremberg, Fürth, Erlangen 

"The Long Night of the Sciences" in the region of Nuremberg, Fürth and Erlangen is held every two years and offers events in the fields of natural sciences, technology, medicine and health as well as social, cultural and economic sciences. The event, which started in 2003, will open its doors for the ninth time on Saturday 19 October 2019. The goal is to build a bridge between research and public. The program contains a wide range of exhibitions, experiments and presentations - hosted by more than 300 institutions including the six regional universities as well as innovative companies and local establishments. In the afternoon there is also a special program for children. During the night the participating institutions will be connected by a special bus service driving ten different routes.

In 2013 there had been registered more than 30.000 participants on 130 locations. Most of the visitors were younger than 30 years.

See also 

 Long Night of Museums

External links 

 Lange Nacht der Wissenschaften in Dresden
 Lange Nacht der Wissenschaft in Berlin und Potsdam (in German)
 Die Lange Nacht der Wissenschaften in Nürnberg-Fürth-Erlangen (in German)
 Nacht des Wissens in Hamburg (in German)
 Nacht der Wissenschaft in Heidelberg, Mannheim und Ludwigshafen (in German)
 Die Lange Nacht der Wissenschaft in Rostock (in German)
 Binger Nacht der Wissenschaft in Bingen am Rhein (in German)
 Die Nacht, die Wissen schafft in Hannover (in German)
 Die Lange Nacht der Technik in Ilmenau: First edition 2007, Most recent edition 2019 (in German)

Recurring events established in 2000
Science and technology in Germany
Science events in Germany